FUNET was created in 1984 to link Finnish universities. The .fi top-level domain was registered 1986. FICIX was created in 1993 to interconnect Finnish IP networks and commercial sales of Internet connection began.

Since July 2010, Finland has become the first country in the world to make Internet access a legal right.

Broadband 
Broadband Internet access in Finland was launched commercially in 2000 in the form of ADSL.

In October 2009, Finland's Ministry of Transport and Communications committed to ensuring that every person in Finland can access the Internet at a minimum speed of one megabit per second starting July 2010.

, 80 % of Finnish households have the option of purchasing landline internet of at least 10 Mbit/s, with 71 % having an option for at least 100 Mbit/s and 60 % having an option for at least 1000 Mbit/s. 99.4 % of Finnish homes are within range of a 30 Mbit/s 4G mobile internet connenction, while 77.1 % are reached by a 300 Mbit/s 5G connection.

Internet service providers 
Some of the largest Finnish Internet service providers include:
 Telia
 Elisa
 DNA

Censorship 

Some ISPs are using a voluntary child pornography censorship list administered by the police. The list has been criticised because it has contained legal adult content, that little has been done to actually shut down the illegal websites and, as the list is secret, it can be used for any censorship. More recently, a government-sponsored report has considered establishing similar filtering in order to curb online gambling.

Also, there are legally binding court orders to block The Pirate Bay issued to all major ISPs.

See also 
 Right to Internet access

References

External links 
 History of Internet in Finland